Dream Careers Inc. formerly known as University of Dreams, is an American corporation providing mainly summer internship programs. The company is based in San Mateo, California. According to The New York Times, they are one of the most visible players in the industry.

History 
The company was founded in February 2000 by Eric Lochtefeld as University of Dreams. It was featured on the Inc. 500 list of fastest-growing companies in American and also on an NPR broadcast.

University of Dreams acquired Career Explorations, a summer internship program for high school students, in 2010 and renamed itself to the current name of Dream Careers.

Services 
Dream Careers offers internships to college undergraduates. It charges a flat fee for an internship placement, housing, transportation, meals, and other related services.

References

External links

Education companies established in 2000
Scholarships in the United States
Internships
Education in Redwood City, California
Companies based in Redwood City, California